= Janasz Palace =

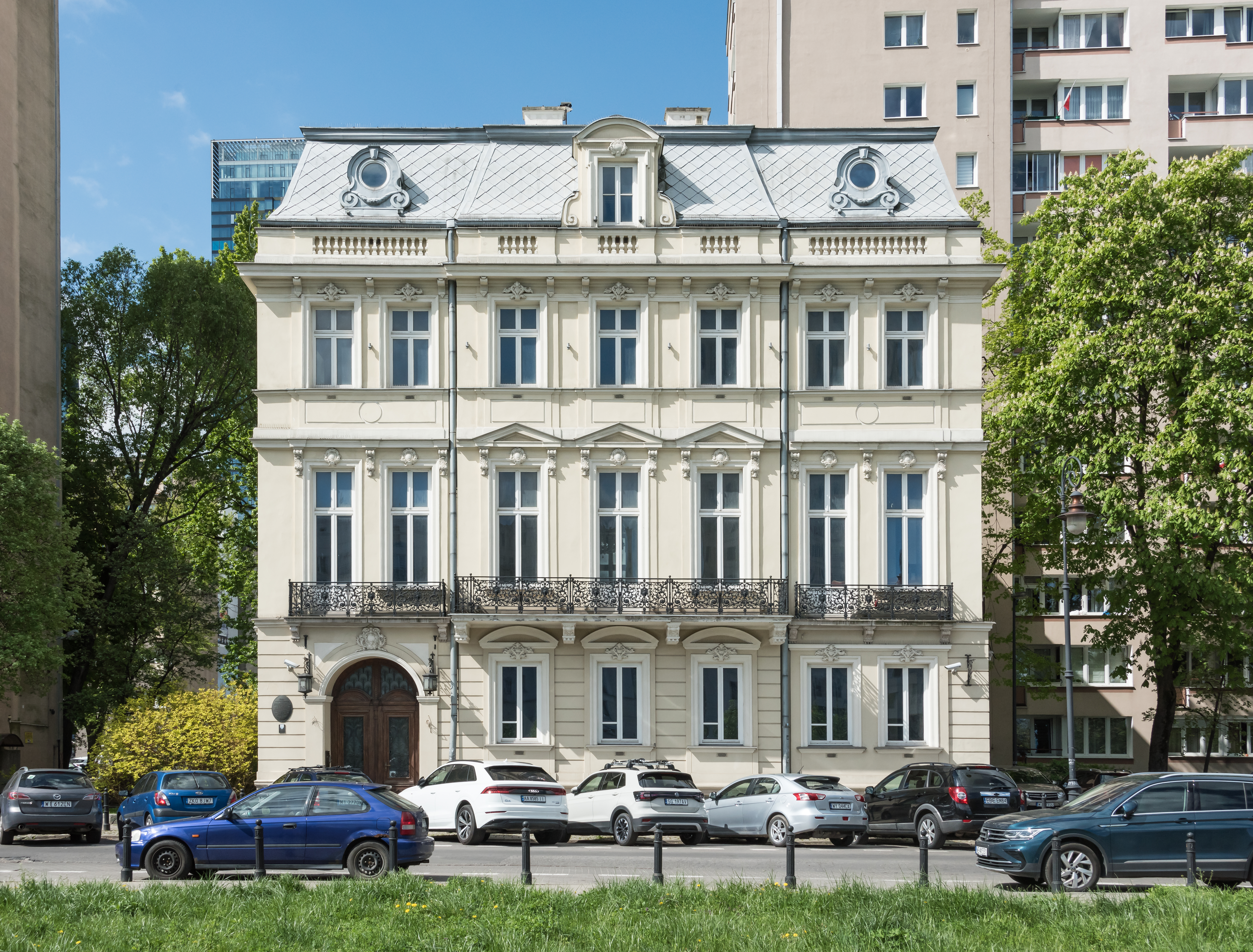
- Janasz Palace

- Location of Janasz Palace in Poland
- 52°14′14″N 21°00′20″E
- Location: Warsaw, Mazowsze Province, Poland

History
- Built: 1870–80

Site notes
- Architect: Jan Kacper Heurich
- Architectural style: Neo-Baroque

The Janasz Palace (Polish: Pałac Janaszów, Pałac Janaszów Czackich) is a historic building on ulica Zielna in Warsaw, Poland.

It was built in 1870–80 for Jakub Janasz to a design by Jan Kacper Heurich.

It suffered little in World War II and is the best preserved palace in Warsaw from the second half of the nineteenth century. In 1970–73 the exterior and interior were restored to their original Neo-Baroque condition.

It is now headquarters to the Polish Monuments Conservation Works (Polskie Pracownie Konserwacji Zabytków).

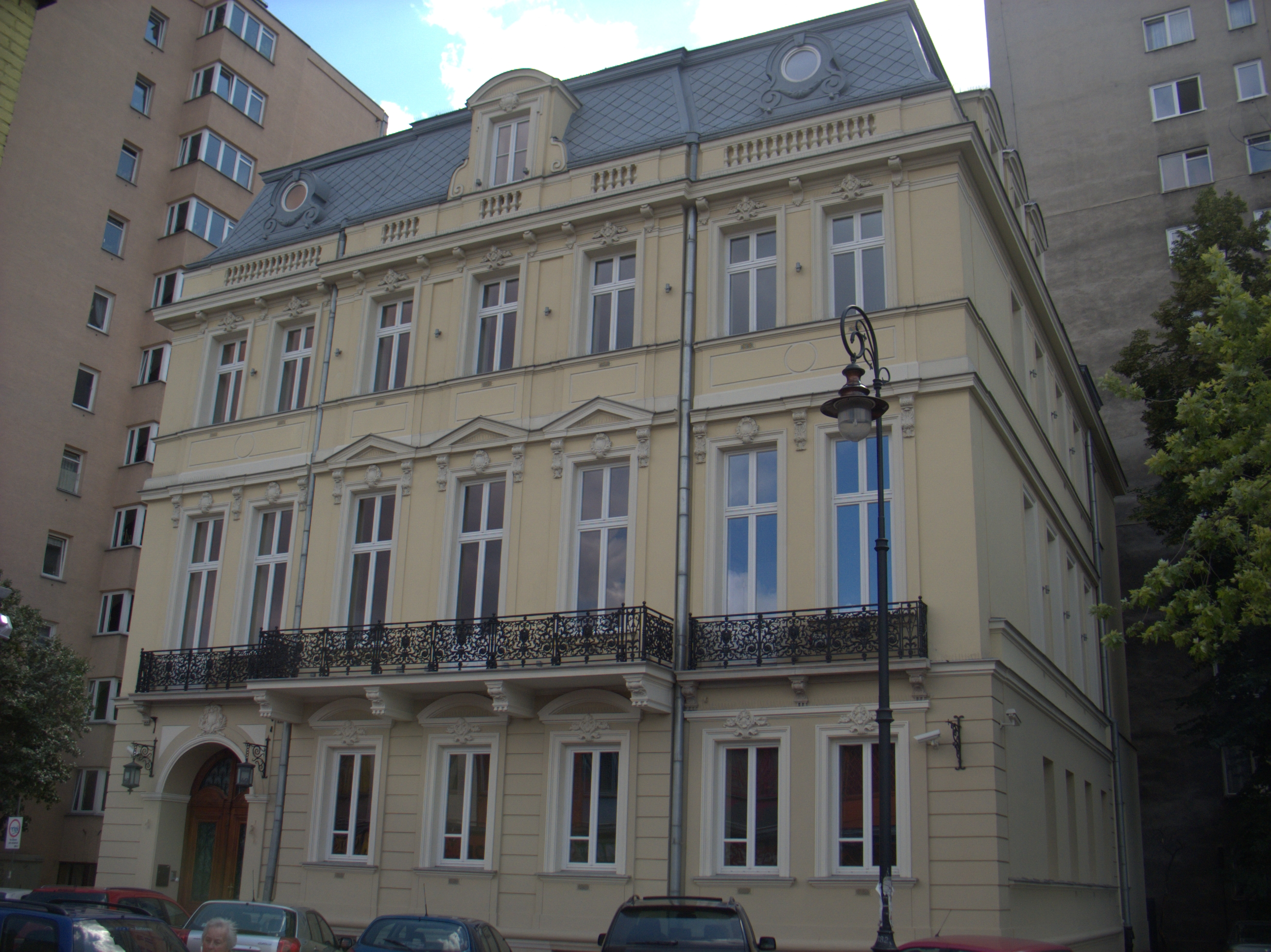
Façade

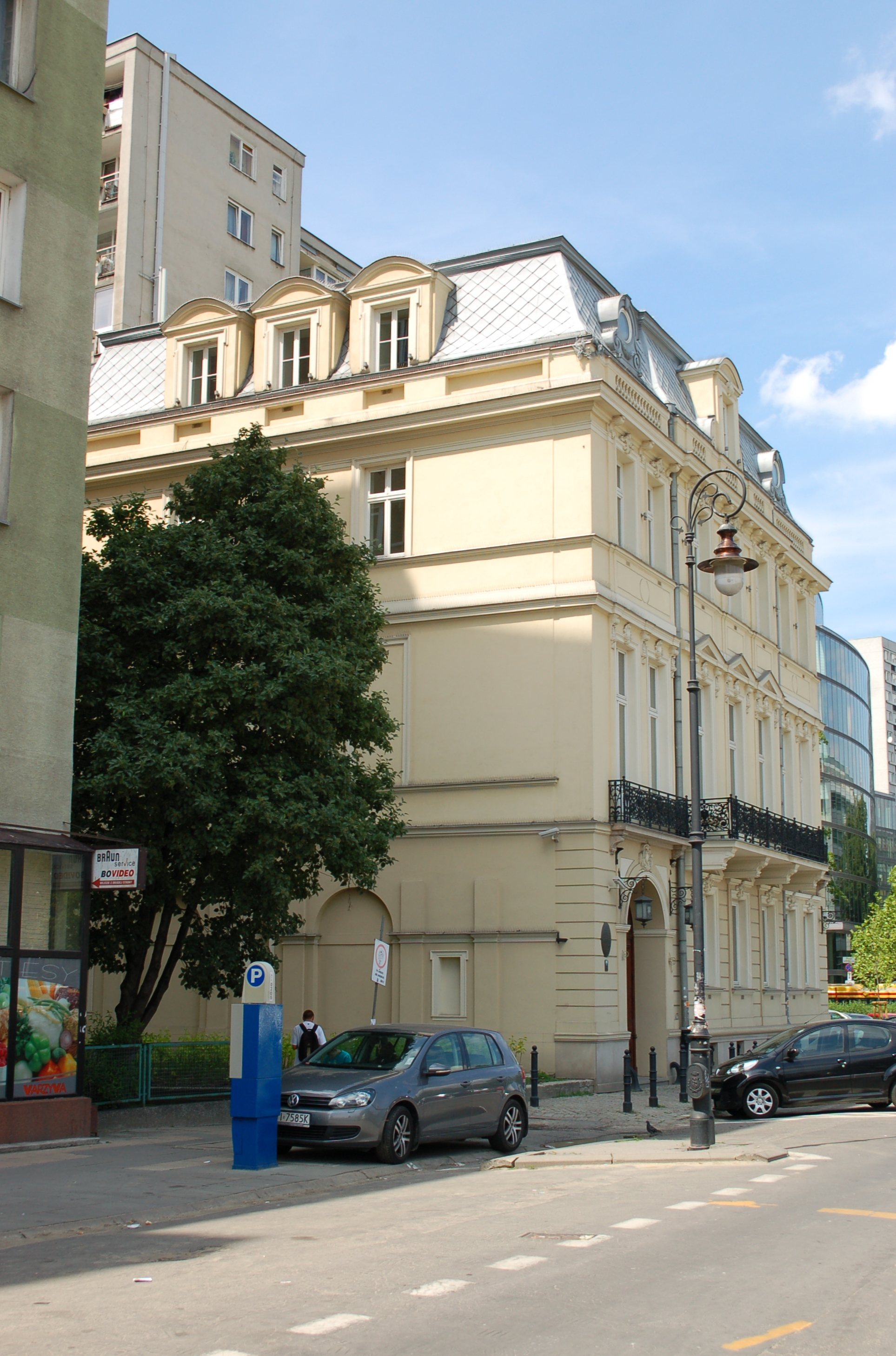
View from ulica Zielna

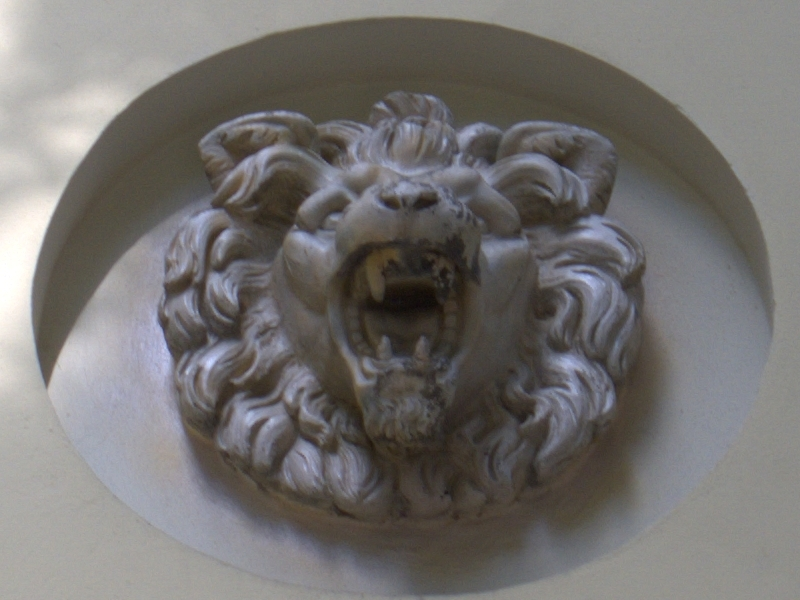
Façade sculptural detail
